VOICE is Indiana's statewide initiative to engage, educate, and empower teens to celebrate a tobacco free lifestyle. The VOICE movement began in the spring of 2002. Since then, thousands of teens across Indiana have been exposed to the truth of the manipulative marketing tactics of Big Tobacco. The VOICE Movement has helped Indiana reduce its youth smoking rates to historic lows.

Initial motivation

Statistics

Indiana had one of the highest ranking youth smoking rates in the country. Currently, 22.5 percent of Indiana's youth are regular smokers and 9,800 youth pick up smoking each year. Estimates by Campaign for Tobacco-Free Kids state that 160,000 youth in Indiana today will die prematurely from smoking-related illnesses. These stats, along with many others, are part of the driving force behind the Voice mission.

Industry quotes

In the last few decades, several documents have surfaced from inside the tobacco industry, showing the tobacco industry's longstanding practice of marketing their products towards youth. Some highlights include:

Activism highlights 
Voice began with a 20-member Youth Advisory Board, ages 15–17, which offered input about likes and dislikes of teenagers in Indiana. This Youth Advisory Board assisted in developing a statewide youth-led tobacco prevention movement beginning with a statewide summit in early 2002. The challenge was to drive down the 39 percent of Indiana's high school students that smoked. This summit produced some of the initial ideas for youth activism.

Highlights of other events and accomplishments include:
Yearly Statewide Summits
Protest of Camel No.9 Cigarettes
10,000 Signed Petitions in support of R-rating smoking in movies
Helping to lower teen-smoking rates in Indiana by 16 percent
Emily Kile, Voice youth, testifying before Indiana Congress for smoke-free workplaces
Statewide Voice Road Tour
Largest youth protest (400 youth) in Indiana history on Monument Circle

References 

Youth organizations based in Indiana
Medical and health organizations based in Indiana